Flying Blue is a Hong Kong-based racehorse. He was one of the nominees of 2010–2011 Hong Kong Horse of the Year.

Background
Flying Blue is a brown gelding bred in Australia by B. J. & Mrs L. E. Anderton. He was sired by the British sprinter Piccolo, whose other progeny include La Cucaracha (Nunthorpe Stakes) and Picaday (The T J Smith). He is a representative of the Godolphin Arabian sire-line.

Racing career
Based at Sha Tin Racecourse Flying Blue has earned more than HK$4.4M in prize money. His wins include the Chairman's Trophy in April 2011, when he won from a field which included Viva Pataca.

References

 The Hong Kong Jockey Club – Flying Blue Racing Record
 The Hong Kong Jockey Club

Racehorses bred in Australia
Racehorses trained in Hong Kong
Hong Kong racehorses
Thoroughbred family 2-o